Barilius malabaricus is a fish in genus Barilius of the family Cyprinidae. It is found in the Payaswini and Vallapattanam rivers in India.

References 

M
Fish described in 1849